Garak Fish Market or Garak-dong Agricultural Market is an extensive farmers fish market in the neighborhood of Garak-dong in Songpa-gu, Seoul, South Korea. It is served by Garak Market station.

Gallery

See also
List of markets in South Korea
List of South Korean tourist attractions

References

Songpa District
Retail markets in Seoul
Fish markets